John Attey (d. c. 1640) was an English composer of lute songs or ayres.

Little is known about his life. He appears to have been patronised by John Egerton, 1st Earl of Bridgewater and the Countess Frances, to whom he dedicates his First Booke of Ayres of Foure Parts, with Tableture for the Lute, in 1622. On the title-page of this work he calls himself a "Gentleman and Practitioner of Musicke." It contains fourteen songs in four parts, which may be sung as part-songs or as solos by a soprano voice, accompanied by the lute, or the lute and bass-viol. The suggestion that the accompaniment could be lute alone is unusual.

As no second collection appeared, it is probable that the composer did not meet with sufficient encouragement in all cases. Besides, the English madrigal period was rapidly declining; indeed, the book is among the last known books of lute airs. He died at Ross about 1640.

Works
First Booke of Ayres of Foure Parts, with Tableture for the Lute, pub. 1622; ed. Edmund Fellowes, 1926; Greer, 1967.
 On a time the amorous Silvy
 The gordion knot which Alexander
 What is all this world but vaine?
 In a grove of trees of Mirtle
 Shall I tell you whom I love?
 My dearest and devinest love
 Bright Starre of Beauty
 Think not tis I alone
 Joy my muse, since there is one
 My dayes, my moneths, my yeares
 Madame, for you I little grieve
 Resound my voyce
 Vaine hope adue
 Sweet was the song the Virgin sung

Notes

References
 

17th-century English composers
English madrigal composers
English male composers
Year of birth unknown
1640 deaths
English male classical composers
English classical composers
17th-century male musicians